Daniel Hernández is a Mexican former tennis player who was active in the 1930s.

Between 1935 and 1939, Hernández appeared in six Davis Cup ties for Mexico. He competed twice against top American player Don Budge and won his only two singles rubbers in his debut tie against Cuba.

Hernández was a men's doubles gold medalist at the 1938 Central American and Caribbean Games in Panama City, partnering Esteban Reyes. He also won a bronze medal for Mexico in the mixed doubles.

See also
List of Mexico Davis Cup team representatives

References

External links
 
 

Year of birth missing
Possibly living people
Mexican male tennis players
Competitors at the 1938 Central American and Caribbean Games
Central American and Caribbean Games medalists in tennis
Central American and Caribbean Games gold medalists for Mexico
Central American and Caribbean Games bronze medalists for Mexico
20th-century Mexican people